The Compagnies républicaines de sécurité (Republican Security Corps), abbreviated CRS, are the general reserve of the French National Police. They are primarily involved in general security missions, but the task for which they are best known is crowd and riot control. The DCCRS has seven units: in Paris, Lille, Rennes, Bordeaux, Marseille, Lyon and Metz.

There are 60 "general service" CRS companies, specialized in public order and crowd control; nine "motorway" companies specialized in highway patrol in urban areas; and six "zonal" motorcycle units (one per Defense zone.) Two additional companies and several mountain detachments administratively attached to local companies specialize in Mountain Rescue. One company (CRS n°1) specializes in VIP escort. The National Police band is also a CRS unit.

Some of the CRS officers from the "general service" companies are cross trained and serve as lifeguards on the beaches during the summer vacations.

The expression "les CRS" refers to the whole force. The feminine singular "une CRS" means a company (the noun compagnie is feminine), but the masculine singular "un CRS" is often used to mean "a CRS man"; the press and laypeople frequently use "CRS" to mean any policeman in riot gear and wearing a helmet, whether he is a true CRS or a policeman or a gendarme mobile. The form "trois CRS" in theory means three companies, but is often used to mean three men.

History
The CRS were created on 8 December 1944, after the Groupes mobiles de réserve (GMR) (created by the Vichy régime) were dissolved. The CRS are a civilian corps (unlike the gendarmes, who are military), trained in anti-insurrection and antiriot techniques. The CRS saw their first serious action during the 1947 strikes in France.

Communist sympathisers were strongly represented in the ranks of some of the early companies (due to their history of engagement in the French Resistance, and according to some - due to a desire to practice entryism). The French Communist Party (PCF) took on the role of opposition to postwar governments. On 12 November 1947, there was a demonstration in Marseilles called by the communist union CGT and the French Communist Party; some of the local CRS (a majority of whom were communists at the time), refused to act against it and several companies were dissolved as a consequence while a few more were reorganized in 1948 to remove communist influence from their ranks.

CRS detachments were created in some of the French overseas territories in 1950. The Guadeloupe and Réunion detachments were transformed into companies during the early 1960s but these were disestablished in the 1990s. Up to sixteen additional companies were created in Algeria during the Algerian War of Independence and disestablished at the end of the conflict.

CRS equipment and organization have evolved in phases. A major change in equipment followed the May 1968 demonstrations. During the 1990s, the equipment continued to evolve and the CRS were re-equipped with smaller vans to better adapt the companies to the urban environment (both in their surveillance and riot control missions).

Missions
The "general service" companies, together with the mobile gendarmerie, constitute a highly mobile reserve force for the government. Their missions include: 
 Providing security during large public events and mass gatherings such as ceremonies, sport events, festivals, concerts, and demonstrations 
 Patrolling and securing specific areas (borders, suburban areas) 
 Maintaining law and order during demonstrations, riot control
 Reinforcing local police forces in their general security missions

Organization

 1 Central Directorate under a Director-general of the National Police in Paris
 7 Zonal Directorates (one for each metropolitan military defence zone)
 60 "General Service" Companies (for the maintenance of public order)
 1 VIP Escort Compagny (CRS n° 1)
 9 Autoroute Companies (dedicated to Highway Patrol)
 6 Zonal Motorcycle Units
 2 Mountain Companies (Alpes and Pyrenees) - specialized in Mountain Rescue
 The National Police Band (attached to CRS n° 1)

Some of the CRS officers are cross trained and serve as lifeguards during the summer season. They also enforce applicable laws on the beaches.

The CRS are based in barracks but, unlike the gendarmes, they live at home when not on the road. A company typically spends more than 200 days per year away from its base town.

Company composition

Most of the "general service" companies have a headquarters platoon and four line platoons each, a few companies having a sixth platoon or SMS equipped with special crowd/riot control equipment such as water cannons).

A complement of a regular company is as follows:
 1 Company commander with the rank of Police Commandant (Major).
 1 Police Captain
 2 Police Lieutenants
 1–4 Brigadiers-Major
 12–25 Brigadiers-Chief
 100–120 officers

Criticism
The suppressive role and occasional abuse of force by the CRS towards protesters or even school children has led to criticisms among human rights supporters. There have also been a number of complaints against CRS officers on the subject of racism and racial profiling.

"CRS = SS" was a famous slogan of May 68.

Note on the French mobile police forces

The two French anti-riot forces, the CRS and the Gendarmerie Mobile are often mistaken for each other, as some of their missions are similar, but they can be distinguished by uniform. The uniform of the CRS is blue while that of the gendarmes mobiles is black. The CRS wear a big red CRS patch and their helmets sport yellow bands; the gendarmes have a stylized grenade on their medium-blue helmets.

In January 2009, the French state implemented a rapprochement ("bringing together") of the police and the gendarmerie. While this policy falls short of a complete fusion or merger, as the gendarmes have kept their military status (while the CRS are a highly unionized civilian body), this has led to more commonality in terms of equipment for the two forces.

Notes and references

Bibliography
 Robert Le Texier, Les Compagnies Républicaines de Sécurité, éditions Lavauzelle, Paris-Limoges, 1981.
 Maurice Agulhon and Fernand Barrat: C.R.S. à Marseille 1944-1947 6 Armand Collin, Paris 1971.
 Jean-Louis Courtois, CRS au service de la nation, C/O Crepin-Leblond, novembre 2004.

External links

 La Direction centrale des compagnies républicaines de sécurité, CRS page on the French National police website
History of the CRS 

1944 establishments in France
National Police (France)